Leandro Novais de Souza Alves or simply Leandro (born January 31, 1988 in Sao Paulo), is a Brazilian attacking midfielder.

Contract
1 February 2007 to 31 January 2009

External links
 CBF

1988 births
Living people
Brazilian footballers
Sport Club Corinthians Paulista players
Associação Portuguesa de Desportos players
Association football midfielders
Footballers from São Paulo